Arsinoitheriidae is a family of hoofed mammals belonging to the extinct order Embrithopoda. Remains have been found in the Middle East, Africa, Asia and Romania. When alive, they would have borne a strong but superficial resemblance to modern rhinoceroses; however, they were not closely related to them (or any other perissodactyl), instead being more closely related to hyraxes, elephants, sirenians, and possibly desmostylians (as part of the superorder afrotheria).

Fossil record

The last genus, Arsinoitherium, was first recovered from the Latest Eocene of the Fayum; it disappears from the fossil record altogether before the end of the Early Oligocene.

Etymology
The name honors the wife of Ptolemy II, Queen Arsinoe II of Egypt, as the first fossils of Arsinoitherium were found near the ruins of her palace.

References

External links
The Paleobiology Database
Mikko's Phylogeny Archive

Embrithopods
Oligocene mammals
Eocene first appearances
Rupelian extinctions
Prehistoric mammal families